The black phoebe (Sayornis nigricans) is a passerine bird in the tyrant-flycatcher family. It breeds from southwest Oregon and California south through Central and South America. It occurs year-round throughout most of its range and migrates less than the other birds in its genus, though its northern populations are partially migratory. Six subspecies are commonly recognized, although two are occasionally combined as a separate species, the white-winged phoebe.

The black phoebe has predominantly black plumage, with a white belly and undertail coverts. The sexes are identical in color, and juveniles have brown feather tips and brown wing-bars. Its song is a repeated tee-hee, tee ho. It lives in a variety of habitats but is always near water. It is mainly insectivorous and waits on a perch before sallying out and catching its prey in the air. It makes an open cup nest which is placed under a cliff or a bridge and cemented in its place with mud.

Description 

The black phoebe is a medium-sized flycatcher, being  in length and weighing . It has predominantly black plumage, with white on its belly and undertail coverts. The white forms an inverted "V" in the lower breast. The sexes are identical and plumage does not vary seasonally. Juveniles have browner plumage, cinnamon-brown feather tips on their body, and brown wing-bars. The bird has brown irises and black legs, feet, and beak.

The phoebe can be recognized by a characteristic "tail-wagging" motion, in which the tail is lowered and the tail's feathers fanned out. It accomplishes almost all locomotion by flight, which is direct, with steady wing beats. Its song consists of two alternating phrases (tee-hee, tee-ho or sisee, sitsew). The song can be heard from both sexes, but is more commonly sung by males.

Systematics 

The phoebes are a genus, Sayornis, of birds in the tyrant flycatcher family. The flycatchers are the largest family of birds on earth, with over 400 known species. The genus name was given by George Robert Gray of the British Museum, and is named after Thomas Say, an American naturalist. The species name, nigricans, is Latin for "blackish", and was given by William John Swainson in 1827.

The black phoebe has six subspecies, but these can be divided into two groups which are sometimes considered to be separate species: the nigricans group (black phoebe) and the latirostris group (white-winged phoebe). The first group contains four subspecies, the second group two.

Distribution and habitat 

The black phoebe breeds in the west and southwest United States, Mexico and Central America, and parts of South America. In Oregon it is found in river valleys on the Pacific coast, and in California on the western side of Coast Ranges. It breeds throughout the Colorado River valley and occasionally is found to the north in southern Nevada and southwestern Utah, as well as Arizona and central New Mexico. In Central America it breeds on Baja California, except for the central part of the peninsula, and on interior mainland Mexico southwest to Panama, excluding El Salvador. In South America it is found in the coastal mountains of Venezuela, through Colombia, Ecuador, and Peru, to western Bolivia and northwestern Argentina.

It lives year-round in most of its range and is more sedentary (non-migratory) than either of the other phoebes in its genus (Eastern or Say's), although northern populations may be partially migratory. It is always found near water and is often found at coastal cliffs, river/lake banks, or even park fountains. Habitats must also include a supply of mud for nest building, and the birds' specialized nesting requirements probably cause their somewhat irregular range.

References

Further reading

External links

 Black phoebe - Sayornis nigricans - USGS Patuxent Bird Identification InfoCenter
 
 
 

black phoebe
Native birds of the Southwestern United States
Native birds of the West Coast of the United States
Fauna of the California chaparral and woodlands
Birds of the Rio Grande valleys
Fauna of the Lower Colorado River Valley
Birds of Central America
Birds of the Northern Andes
Least concern biota of North America
Least concern biota of the United States
black phoebe
black phoebe